The 2015 Chrono des Nations was the 34th edition of the Chrono des Nations cycle race and was held on 18 October 2015. The race started and finished in Les Herbiers. The race was won by Vasil Kiryienka.

General classification

References

2015
2015 in road cycling
2015 in French sport
October 2015 sports events in France